This is a list of tallest buildings in the city of Tijuana, Baja California. Tijuana has the most high rises in northern Mexico after Monterrey. The tallest highrise in Tijuana is Newcity Medical Plaza at

Tallest buildings
This includes spires and architectural details but does not include antenna masts.

Tallest under construction and approved.

Tallest proposed

See also
 List of tallest buildings in Monterrey
 List of tallest buildings in Mexico City
 List of tallest buildings in Mexico
 List of tallest buildings in Latin America
 List of tallest buildings in North America

References

External links

 Tijuana Skyscraper Diagram

Tijuana